Wilhelmus Anthonius Josephus Luxemburg (Delft, 11 April 1929 – 2 October 2018) was a Dutch American mathematician who was a professor of mathematics at the California Institute of Technology.

He received his B.A. from the University of Leiden in 1950; his M.A., in 1953; his Ph.D., from the Delft Institute of Technology, in 1955. He was assistant professor at Caltech during 1958–60; Associate Professor, during 1960–62; Professor, during 1962–2000; Professor Emeritus, from 2000. He was the Executive Officer for Mathematics during 1970–85. In 2012 he became a fellow of the American Mathematical Society. Luxemburg became a corresponding member of the Royal Netherlands Academy of Arts and Sciences in 1974.

Luxemburg contributed to the development of non-standard analysis by popularizing the construction of hyperreal numbers in the 1960s. Though Edwin Hewitt had shown the construction in 1948, the formalization of non-standard analysis is generally associated with Abraham Robinson.

Other notable work he did was in the theory of Riesz spaces (partially ordered vector spaces where the order structure is a lattice).

Selected publications
 1955: Banach function spaces. Thesis, Technische Hogeschool te Delft, 1955.
 1969: "A general theory of monads", in Applications of Model Theory to Algebra, Analysis, and Probability (Internat. Sympos., Pasadena, Calif., 1967) pp. 18–86 Holt, Rinehart and Winston
 1971: (with Zaanen, A. C.) Riesz Spaces. Vol. I. North-Holland Mathematical Library. North-Holland Publishing Co., Amsterdam-London; American Elsevier Publishing Co., New York.
 1976: (with Stroyan, K. D.) Introduction to the Theory of Infinitesimals. Pure and Applied Mathematics, No. 72. Academic Press
 1978: (with Schep, A. R.) "A Radon-Nikodym type theorem for positive operators and a dual", Nederl. Akad. Wetensch. Indag. Math. 40, no. 3, 357–375.
 1979: Some Aspects of the Theory of Riesz Spaces, University of Arkansas Lecture Notes in Mathematics, 4. University of Arkansas, Fayetteville, Ark.

References

External links

See also
Influence of non-standard analysis

20th-century Dutch mathematicians
21st-century Dutch mathematicians
American people of Dutch descent
20th-century American mathematicians
21st-century American mathematicians
California Institute of Technology faculty
Delft University of Technology alumni
Fellows of the American Mathematical Society
Members of the Royal Netherlands Academy of Arts and Sciences
People from Delft
1929 births
2018 deaths
Functional analysts